Statistics of Úrvalsdeild in the 1938 season.

Overview
It was contested by 4 teams, and Valur won the championship. Valur's Magnús Bergsteinsson, Fram's Jón Sigurðsson and Víkingur's Björgvin Bjarnason were the joint top scorers with 3 goals.

League standings

Results

References

Úrvalsdeild karla (football) seasons
Iceland
Iceland
Urvalsdeild